Darb Has (also Romanized as Darb Ḩaş; also known as Darb-e ’aş and Dar-e Ras) is a village in Kezab Rural District, Khezrabad District, Saduq County, Yazd Province, Iran. At the 2006 census, its population was 45, in 20 families.

References 

Populated places in Saduq County